Kentucky Route 252 (KY 252, known locally as Port Oliver Circle, or Barren River Dam Road) is a  north–south route traversing two counties in south-central Kentucky in the Barren River Lake area. Both its north and south termini are intersections with U.S. Route 31E (US 31E) at two separate locations in two different counties.

Route description 
The beginning of KY 252 is located at a crossroads intersection with US 31E and KY 1855 in the Allen County community of Cedar Springs, located just northeast of Scottsville and just west of the Barren River Lake State Resort Park. An intersection with the short KY 1533 is located just before KY 252 reaches the Barren River Dam and the Allen–Barren county line.

KY 252 reaches the unincorporated community of Finney after crossing the Barren River Dam into Barren County. It has a junction at the southern terminus of KY 255 just north of the lake. KY 252 reaches its end at a second intersection with US 31E in Haywood, a small community just south of Glasgow.

Major intersections

References

0252
0252
0252